Epiblema absconditana is a moth belonging to the family Tortricidae. The species was first described by Jean Jacques Charles de La Harpe in 1860.

It is native to Europe.

References

Eucosmini
Moths described in 1860